Frank William Zombo III (born March 5, 1987) is a former American football linebacker. He was signed by the Green Bay Packers as an undrafted free agent in 2010 and later won Super Bowl XLV with them over the Pittsburgh Steelers. He played college football at Central Michigan.

Early years
Zombo graduated from Adlai E. Stevenson High School in 2005 where he also played high school football.

College career
Zombo was a four-year letterman at Central Michigan, appearing in all 55 games during his four seasons with 39 starts as a defensive end. He finished his career ranked second in school history with 25½ sacks. Zombo also earned 1st team All-MAC honors twice.

Professional career

Green Bay Packers
After going undrafted in the 2010 NFL Draft, Zombo signed with the Green Bay Packers on April 30, 2010.

In Super Bowl XLV, Zombo was a starter and recorded a sack as well as five tackles (two for a loss), as Green Bay defeated the Pittsburgh Steelers 31–25 to bring the Lombardi trophy back to Green Bay for the first time in 14 years.

In 2012, Zombo missed the first eight games of the season due to a hamstring injury, and was placed on the physically unable to perform list. Zombo was activated on November 3.

Kansas City Chiefs
On April 3, 2013, Zombo signed with the Kansas City Chiefs. He signed a three-year, $3.6 million contract extension in March 2016.

On September 1, 2018, Zombo was released by the Chiefs. He was re-signed by the Chiefs on October 9, 2018.

NFL career statistics

Regular season

References

External links
Kansas City Chiefs bio
Central Michigan Chippewas bio

1987 births
Living people
Players of American football from Michigan
Sportspeople from Sterling Heights, Michigan
American football linebackers
Central Michigan Chippewas football players
Green Bay Packers players
Kansas City Chiefs players